Thomas Fox (3 October 1876 – 20 April 1951) was an Australian politician, who was a Member of the Legislative Assembly of Western Australia from 1935 to 1951. Earlier, in 1902, Fox played with Australian rules football club Carlton in the Victorian Football League (VFL).

Biography
Fox was born in Scarsdale, Victoria on 3 October 1876.

By 1903, he had moved to Davyhust in the Western Australian Goldfields with a friend Frank Bourke where both worked in the mines and played football for Mines Rovers Football Club.  He later moved to Boulder where he gained interest in the union movement and the welfare of workers.  Following injuries he received as a result of a cave in and the birth of his youngest child he moved to  Fremantle and was working as a dockworker.

He became Secretary and President of the Waterside Workers Union prior to his election as the Labor Party candidate for the Western Australian Legislative Assembly, representing South Fremantle in 1935.  Fox retained this post until his death in 1951.

Fox was survived by his wife Marion Fox, a son John, daughters Marion Dwyer and Margaret Jennings.

Notes

External links 

		
Tom Fox's profile at Blueseum		

1876 births
Australian rules footballers from Victoria (Australia)
Carlton Football Club players
Members of the Western Australian Legislative Assembly
Australian sportsperson-politicians
Ballarat Imperial Football Club players
Mines Rovers Football Club players
1951 deaths
Australian Labor Party members of the Parliament of Western Australia